Holalkere Rangarao Chandrasekhar,  known as "Chandra", was a professor of physics, department chair and director of graduate studies at the University of Missouri. He is an Alfred P. Sloan Fellow and a past consultant to the United Nations Development under the TOKTEN project.

Early life
Chandrasekhar was born at Holalkere,(ಹೊಳಲ್ಕೆರೆ) a small hamlet in the Chitradurga state, of Karnataka state. His parents were H.V.Rangarao  and D.Radhamma. Father was the local auditor, and Shanubhogue of Chirnahalli,(ಚೀರನಹಳ್ಳಿ) and Kudinirkatte, (ಕುಡಿನೀರಕಟ್ಟೆ) hobalies, belonging to Holalkere taluk. He was a well known Astrologer.

Honors
 1996-97: Visiting research scholar, Department of Physics, Purdue University, West Lafayette, IN 47907 (June-Dec. 1996) ; 
 Visiting research professor, Optical Sciences Center, University of Arizona, Tucson.(Jan. -June 1997).
 1993: Consultant to India under the Transfer of Knowledge (TOKTEN) program sponsored by the United Nations Development Program (UNDP).
 1980-1984: Alfred P. Sloan Foundation Fellowship. One of twenty-one physicists selected in National Competition on the basis of "exceptional potential to make creative contributions to scientific knowledge in the early stages of career".

References

External links
  Hindu temple opens doors Community center first of kind in city. By SETH ASHLEY of the Tribune’s staff-Published Saturday, November 12, 2005
 H.R.Chandrasekhar, Kannada Songs, Riddles and Proverbs in Kannada Script
 COLUMBIA, Faith and Values, 'Thanksgiving : A Hindu perspective', Nov, 20, 2012-Chandra
  Vox inside Vox, Life is cyclical for HindusReincarnation can be a chance to finish one's life work- BY HARUMENDHAH HELMY FEBRUARY 9, 2012
  Department of Physics and Astronomy, Physicist’s Research Useful for Fabrication of New Devices
 'Shanthi Sandesh, Philosophy of the Upanishads'-H.R.Chandrasekhar
 'Self realization, Nachiketa's story'-h.R.Chandrasekhar
 'Purusha and the Creation Allegory'-Chandra
  One India (kannada) ಕರ್ಣಾಟಕ ಭಾಗವತ : ತಾಳೆಗರಿಯಿಂದ ಬಿಳಿಹಾಳೆಗೆ, Dr.M.S.Nataraj, Photomech, Maryland, USA, July 5, 2012

21st-century American physicists
Indian American
People from Chitradurga district
Bangalore University alumni
Kannada people
1946 births
Living people
University of Missouri physicists